The surname Étienne, also spelled Etienne and Ettienne, may refer to:

 Andre Ettienne (born 1990), Trinidadian footballer
 Charles-Guillaume Étienne (1778–1845), French dramatist and writer
 Clifford Etienne (born 1972), American former heavyweight boxer
 Errol Étienne (born 1941), artist in many media, including watercolor
 Ophélie-Cyrielle Étienne (born 1990), French swimmer
 Roland Étienne (archaeologist) (born 1944), French archaeologist
 Ronald Etienne (born 1896), Grenadian cricketer
 Travis Etienne (born 1999), American football player
 Trevor Etienne, American football player
 Tyson Etienne (born 1999), American basketball player

See also
 Estienne

Surnames of Haitian origin